Prem Pradeep  is an Indian politician. He was elected to the lower House of the Indian Parliament the Lok Sabha from Nawada, Bihar as a member of the Communist Party of India (Marxist).

References

External links
Official biographical sketch in Parliament of India website

Communist Party of India (Marxist) politicians
1932 births
India MPs 1989–1991
Lok Sabha members from Bihar
Living people